Bis(acetylacetonato)iron(II) is a coordination complex of iron with the formula Fe(C5H7O2)2.  It can be prepared by reacting iron(II) chloride with 2,4-pentanedione in presence of piperidine.

Reactions
Bis(acetylacetonato)iron(II) reacts with lithium bis(hydropentalenyl)iron to afford green [(C8H7)Fe]2-[(C8H8)2Fe], a quadruple-decker complex.

It reacts with Li2Pn*(TMEDA)x (Pn* = permethylpentalene) to yield purple-black Fe2Pn*2.

References

Iron(II) compounds
Acetylacetonate complexes